Qillqa (Quechua for writing (the act and art of writing),  Hispanicized spelling Quilca) is a mountain in the Andes of Peru, about  high. It is located in the Puno Region, Lampa Province, on the border of the districts Palca and Paratía. Qillqa lies northwest of the mountains Yanawara, Waykira and Hatun Pastu.

References

Mountains of Peru
Mountains of Puno Region